Johan Fredrik Håkansson (born 2 August 1975) is a male Swedish international table tennis player.

He won a gold medal at the 2000 World Team Table Tennis Championships in the men's team and the following year he won a bronze medal at the 2001 World Table Tennis Championships in the men's teams.

He also competed in the 2000 Summer Olympics.

See also
 List of table tennis players
 List of World Table Tennis Championships medalists

References

External links
 

1957 births
Living people
Swedish male table tennis players
Olympic table tennis players of Sweden
Table tennis players at the 2000 Summer Olympics
World Table Tennis Championships medalists
Sportspeople from Halland County
20th-century Swedish people
21st-century Swedish people